Vaisakha is a month of the Hindu calendar that corresponds to April/May in the Gregorian Calendar. In the Indian national calendar, Vaisakha is the second month of the year. It is the first month of the Vikram Samvat calendar, Odia calendar, Punjabi calendar, Assamese calendar (where it is called Bohag) and the Bengali calendar (where it is called Boishakh). This month lies between the second half of April And The First Half Of May.

Regional calendars used in the Indian subcontinent have two aspects: lunar and solar. Lunar months begin with Chaitra and solar months start with Vaisakha Sankranti. However, regional calendars mark when the official new year is celebrated. In regions such as Maharashtra which begin the official new year with the commencement of the lunar year, the solar year is marked by celebrating Vaisakha Sankranti. Conversely, regions starting the new year with Vaisakha Sankranti, give prominence to the start of the lunar year in Chaitra. In the Vedic calendar, it is called Madhava, and in the Vaishnava calendar, it is called Madhushudana month.

Overview
In the Hindu solar calendar, Vaisakha begins in mid-April in Bengal, Nepal, and Punjab. In Tamil Nadu, it is known as Vaikasi (mid May-mid June) and represents the second month of the Tamil solar calendar. The Tamil month that corresponds to Vaisakha is Chithirai (mid April-mid May). In the Hindu lunar calendar, Vaisakha begins with the new moon in April and represents the second month of the lunar year. The name of the month is derived from the position of the Moon near the Vishākhā constellation ("Nakshatra") on the full-moon day.  In the Vaishnava calendar, Madhusudana governs this month.

The month of Boishakh also marks the official start of Summer. The month is notorious for the afternoon storms called Kalboishakhi (Nor'wester). The storms usually start with strong gusts from the north-western direction at the end of a hot day and cause widespread destruction.

Festivals

The first day of Baishakh is celebrated as the Pôhela Boishak or Bangla New Year's Day. The day is observed with cultural programs, festivals and carnivals all around the country. The day of is also the beginning of all business activities in West Bengal and Bangladesh. The traders starts new fiscal account book called Halkhata. The accounting in the Halkhata begins only after this day. It is celebrated with sweets and gifts with customers.

The harvest festival of Vaisakhi is celebrated on in this month which marks the Punjabi new year according to the Punjabi calendar. Jallianwala Bagh massacre took place on the Punjabi New year day. 

Vaisakha Purnima is celebrated as Buddha Purnima or the birthday of Gautama Buddha amongst Buddhists of South and Southeast Asia, Tibet and Mongolia. Purnima refers to the Full Moon. Known in Sinhala as Vesak, it is observed in the full moon of May.

Vaisakha sukla Panchami is celebrated as Adi Shankara birthday the great philosopher and theologian of Hinduism religion.

Vaishakha Purnima is known as "vaikasi vishakam" in Tamil Nadu which is celebrated as the birthday of Lord Murugan.

Vaisakha sukla chaturdasi is celebrated as Narasimha Jayanti Festival in Sri Varaha Lakshmi Narasimha Swamivari Temple at Simhachalam.

See also

 Astronomical basis of the Hindu calendar

References

Notes 

02